McAfee VirusScan is an antivirus software created and maintained by McAfee (formerly known as Intel Security, and Network Associates prior to that). Originally marketed as a standalone product, it has been bundled with McAfee LiveSafe, McAfee AntiVirus Plus, McAfee Total Protection and McAfee Gamer Security since 2010. McAfee LiveSafe integrates antivirus, firewall and anti-spyware/anti-ransomware capabilities.
In 2006, British telecom company BSkyB started offering Sky Broadband customers a branded version of VirusScan for free upon broadband modem installation.

VirusScan Enterprise
McAfee also produces an enterprise-level product named VirusScan Enterprise: McAfee has designed this for use on larger networks designed to make management of antivirus software on multiple computers easier. Unlike the home-user edition, the Enterprise edition consists of a client application for networked computers, and a server application, which the system installs updates and configures settings for all client programs.  Clients can be controlled using the included ePolicy Orchestrator (ePO), which is a unified console that can control VirusScan and other McAfee products. Support for VirusScan Enterprise ended on December 31, 2021.

VirusScan for Mac
In November 2008 McAfee announced VirusScan for Mac OS. (Earlier versions used the name Virex, developed by HJC Software.) Key changes in VirusScan 8.6 included Leopard Compatibility (a universal binary package that ran on both Intel and PowerPC-based Macs), On-Access scanning, and Apple Mail support.

Controversies

Poor independent test results 
In tests by Virus Bulletin and additional independent consumer-organizations, McAfee VirusScan has not fared well, frequently failing to detect some common viruses.

A review of VirusScan 2006 by CNET criticized the product due to "pronounced performance hits in two of our three real-world performance tests" and some users reviewing the same product reported encountering technical problems.

Some older versions of the VirusScan engine use all available CPU cycles.

, McAfee virus-scanning products did not handle false positives well, repeatedly removing or quarantining known clean files, even after user restoration of these files.

Customer support criticisms
Reviewers have described customer support for McAfee products as lacking, with support staff slow to respond and unable to answer many questions.

2010 reboot problem
On April 21, 2010, beginning approximately at 2 PM GMT, an erroneous virus definition file update from McAfee affected millions of computers worldwide running Windows XP Service Pack 3. The update resulted in the removal of a Windows system file (svchost.exe) on those machines, causing machines to lose network access and, in some cases, to enter a reboot loop. McAfee rectified this by removing and replacing the faulty DAT file, version 5958, with an emergency DAT file (version 5959) and has posted a fix for the affected machines in its consumer "KnowledgeBase".

2012 update issues 
An August 2012 update to McAfee antivirus caused the protection to become turned off and users to lose internet connections. McAfee was criticized for not notifying users promptly of the issues when they learned about it.

Current standing 
McAfee, though well-known, continues to have mixed reviews by industry sources, and the company has prepared a 2015 release series to address current market conditions. This repositioning includes voice and facial recognition authentication for cloud-based data security.

See also

 Comparison of antivirus software
 Comparison of firewalls
 Internet security

References

External links 
 VirusScan for Windows, McAfee
 VirusScan for Mac, McAfee
 Tabular Comparison, Comparison Between Livesafe and Total Protection versions of McAfee

McAfee
Antivirus software
Windows security software
1988 software
MacOS software
Classic Mac OS software